Max Frankel (born April 3, 1930) is an American journalist. He was executive editor of The New York Times from 1986 to 1994.

Life and career
Frankel was born in Gera, Germany. He was an only child, and his family belonged to a Jewish minority in the area. Hitler came to power when Frankel was three years old, and Frankel remembered Germany's racial hatred: "[I] could have become a good little Nazi in his army. I loved the parades; I wept when other kids marched beneath our window without me. But I was ineligible for the Aryan race, the Master Race that Hitler wanted to purify of Jewish blood…"
 
Frankel came to the United States in 1940. He attended the High School of Music & Art in Manhattan, class of 1948. He attended Columbia College, where he was editor-in-chief of the Columbia Daily Spectator, and began part-time work for The New York Times in his sophomore year. He received his BA degree in 1952 and an MA in American government from Columbia in 1953. He joined The Times as a full-time reporter in 1952. After serving in the Army from 1953 to 1955, he returned to the local staff until he was sent overseas in November, 1956, to help cover stories arising from the Hungarian revolution. From 1957 to 1960 he was one of two Times correspondents in Moscow. After a brief tour in the Caribbean, reporting mostly from Cuba, he moved to Washington in 1961, where he became diplomatic correspondent in 1963 and White House correspondent in 1966.

Frankel was chief Washington correspondent and head of the Washington bureau from 1968 to 1972, then Sunday editor of The Times until 1976, editor of the editorial page from 1977 to 1986 and executive editor from 1986 to 1994. He wrote a Times Magazine column on the media from 1995 until 2000. He won the Pulitzer Prize in 1973 for coverage of Richard Nixon's trip to the People's Republic of China.

Frankel was interviewed in the 1985 documentary We Were So Beloved, a movie that interviewed German Jews who immigrated from Nazi Germany to New York City. On November 14, 2001, in the 150th anniversary issue, The New York Times ran an article by the then retired Frankel reporting that before and during World War II, the Times had as a matter of policy largely, though not entirely, ignored reports of the annihilation of European Jews. Frankel called it "the century's bitterest journalistic failure."

Frankel is the author of the book High Noon in the Cold War – Kennedy, Khrushchev and the Cuban Missiles Crisis (Ballantine, 2004 and Presidio 2005) and, also, his memoir, The Times of My Life and My Life with the Times (Random House, 1999, and Delta, 2000).

Personal life
Frankel has been married twice. His first wife was Tobia Brown with whom he had three children: David Frankel, Margot Frankel Goldberg, and Jonathan Frankel. She died of a brain tumor at the age of 52 in 1987. He was married again in 1988 to Joyce Purnick, a Times columnist and editor.

See also
 The New York Times and the Holocaust

References

External links

Official sites
 Random House author bio
 Pulitzer site 1973 prize for international reporting

Interviews
 

1930 births
Living people
People from Gera
Pulitzer Prize for International Reporting winners
Columbia College (New York) alumni
The High School of Music & Art alumni
The New York Times editors
The New York Times writers
Editors of New York City newspapers
Jewish emigrants from Nazi Germany to the United States
Jewish American journalists
21st-century American Jews